Raza Murad (born 23 November 1950) is an Indian actor who appears primarily in Hindi films.

He has over 250 Bollywood film credits. Murad has also appeared in Bhojpuri and Punjabi and other regional-language films and on Hindi television.

Early life
He is the son of the Bollywood character actor Hamid Ali Murad,and was born in Rampur Uttar Pradesh which is known for Rampuri Chakku.  Murad is the first cousin of Zeenat Aman and nephew of Amanullah Khan, writer of Mughal-e-Azam and Pakeezah. His nieces, Sonam and Sanober Kabir, are also performers.

Career
Murad began his career in film Ek Nazar (1972 film), and played sympathetic brothers (and brother figures) in the 1970s. Since the 1980s, he has primarily appeared in supporting roles as a father, uncle, or villain.

Murad studied at the Film and Television Institute of India in Pune from 1969 to 1971, and received a diploma in film acting. With a distinctive baritone voice, one of his memorable roles as a character actor was the despondent poet in 1973's Namak Haraam with Amitabh Bachchan and Rajesh Khanna.

Murad had significant roles in successful Bollywood films such as Raj Kapoor's Prem Rog, Henna and Ram Teri Ganga Maili as well as Khud-daar, Ram Lakhan, Tridev, Pyar Ka Mandir, Aankhen, Mohra, and Gupt. He appeared in 1993's Ek Hi Raasta with Ajay Devgn as a terrorist who attempts to rule India. Murad played a supporting role in Ashutosh Gowariker's Jodhaa Akbar. Murad starred in several Punjabi films, including Jatt Punjabi. He acted in Dharam Jeet (1975) with Punjabi actor Veerendra (Dharmendra's cousin) He received a lifetime achievement award for his contributions to Punjabi cinema at the February 2011 PTC Punjabi Film Awards. Murad has been nominated for seven Filmfare Awards as a villain, winning one. He appeared in the TV series Madhubala – Ek Ishq Ek Junoon. Murad has appeared in several Telugu films, including Indra (2002). He played Jalal-ud-din Khalji, the founder and the first ruler of the Khalji Dynasty of the famous Delhi Sultanate, in a 2018 romantic period drama Padmaavat.

Awards and recognition
 PTC Punjabi Film Awards Lifetime Achievement Award for his contributions to Punjabi Cinema in 2011.

Filmography

See also
List of Indian film actors

References

External links

1950 births
Living people
Film and Television Institute of India alumni
Indian male film actors
Male actors in Hindi cinema
People from Rampur, Uttar Pradesh